Scardinius elmaliensis is a species of ray-finned fish in the family Cyprinidae.
It is found only in Turkey.
Its natural habitats are rivers and freshwater lakes.

References

Scardinius
Endemic fauna of Turkey
Fish described in 1997
Taxonomy articles created by Polbot